Gráinne Cronin (born about 1953) was the first woman to become a pilot for Aer Lingus and the first woman pilot commercially employed in Ireland.

Life 
Born to pilot captain Felim  Cronin in Ennis, County Clare, Cronin's sister Caroline is also a commercial pilot. Her husband is also as pilot and her daughters Alana and Louisa Johnston both hold private pilots licences, and Louisa has a commercial licence. She learned to fly while she was at university in her father's Piper Cub. Rather than teach her to fly, her father asked his first officer Neil Johnston. Johnston taught her to fly and later married Cronin. She lives in Malahide, Ireland.

Career 
Cronin was hired as a pilot by Aer Lingus in 1977. When she first joined in 1975, at the age of 22, it was as a flight attendant. But by the time she was 24 she went for flight training in Oxford. Her first flight was in January 1978. Initially working as a co-pilot, in 1988 she became the airline's first woman captain. She retired on 25 May 2010. SAS were the first European airline to hire a woman pilot and Aer Lingus were the second. Within the next two years they had hired another two women. Though it seems to have taken a long time to get to this point, British Airways didn't hire their first woman pilots for about another 6 years.

References

Aviators from Dublin (city)
1953 births
Living people
Irish women aviators
Women commercial aviators
People from Malahide